Diego Bonilla (born 11 February 2002), is a Uruguayan professional footballer who plays as a forward for Macarthur FC.

Career
Bonilla made his professional debut on 8 December 2021 in a FFA Cup match against A-League Men side Sydney FC.

References

External links

FDB Profile

2002 births
Living people
People from Florida Department
Uruguayan footballers
Australian soccer players
Association football forwards
Marconi Stallions FC players
Macarthur FC players
National Premier Leagues players